Zhou Huaizheng (died 16 August 1020) was a powerful Song dynasty palace eunuch during Emperor Zhenzong's reign. After Emperor Zhenzong's illness in 1019 made him incapable of ruling, state power gradually fell to the hands of his wife Empress Liu and chancellor Ding Wei. Zhou plotted to assassinate Ding so that Kou Zhun could return to chancellorship, but his coup failed. He was arrested by Lei Yungong and executed.

Early life
During the Conquest of Northern Han by Song in 979, eunuch Zhou Shaozhong followed Emperor Taizong of Song and the Song dynasty army to Northern Han's capital Taiyuan. He found a young boy among the dead bodies and adopted him as a son, naming him Zhou Huaizheng. Thus Zhou Huaizheng was able to grow up in the imperial palace as a young eunuch in the Song capital Kaifeng.

Notes and references

 
 

1020 deaths